Kingman County (standard abbreviation: KM) is a county located in the U.S. state of Kansas. As of the 2020 census, the county population was 7,470. The largest city and county seat is Kingman.

History

Early history

For many millennia, the Great Plains of North America was inhabited by nomadic Native Americans.  From the 16th century to 18th century, the Kingdom of France claimed ownership of large parts of North America.  In 1762, after the French and Indian War, France secretly ceded New France to Spain, per the Treaty of Fontainebleau.

19th century
In 1802, Spain returned most of the land to France, but keeping title to about 7,500 square miles.  In 1803, most of the land for modern day Kansas was acquired by the United States from France as part of the 828,000 square mile Louisiana Purchase for 2.83 cents per acre.

In 1854, the Kansas Territory was organized, then in 1861 Kansas became the 34th U.S. state.  In 1872, Kingman County was established and named for Samuel A. Kingman, chief justice of the Kansas Supreme Court.

Geography

Adjacent counties
 Reno County (north)
 Sedgwick County (east)
 Sumner County (southeast)
 Harper County (south)
 Barber County (southwest)
 Pratt County (west)

Demographics

As of the census of 2000, there were 8,673 people, 3,371 households, and 2,420 families residing in the county. The racial makeup of the county was 97.45% White, 0.21% Black or African American, 0.58% Native American, 0.24% Asian, 0.02% Pacific Islander, 0.35% from other races, and 1.15% from two or more races.  1.44% of the population were Hispanic or Latino of any race.

There were 3,371 households, out of which 32.40% had children under the age of 18 living with them, 61.90% were married couples living together, 7.10% had a female householder with no husband present, and 28.20% were non-families. 26.00% of all households were made up of individuals, and 13.80% had someone living alone who was 65 years of age or older.  The average household size was 2.51 and the average family size was 3.03.

In the county, the population was spread out, with 27.40% under the age of 18, 5.80% from 18 to 24, 24.70% from 25 to 44, 22.50% from 45 to 64, and 19.60% who were 65 years of age or older.  The median age was 40 years. For every 100 females there were 96.30 males.  For every 100 females age 18 and over, there were 93.50 males.

The median income for a household in the county was $37,790, and the median income for a family was $44,547. Males had a median income of $31,771 versus $25,298 for females. The per capita income for the county was $18,533.  About 8.40% of families and 10.60% of the population were below the poverty line, including 16.90% of those under age 18 and 7.40% of those age 65 or over.

Government

Presidential elections

Laws
Following amendment to the Kansas Constitution in 1986, the county remained a prohibition, or "dry", county until 2004, when voters approved the sale of alcoholic liquor by the individual drink with a 30 percent food sales requirement.

Education

Unified school districts
 Kingman–Norwich USD 331
 Cunningham–West Kingman County USD 332

Communities

Cities
 Cunningham
 Kingman
 Nashville
 Norwich
 Penalosa
 Spivey
 Zenda

Unincorporated communities
† means a Census-Designated Place (CDP) by the United States Census Bureau.

 Calista
 Cleveland
 Mount Vernon
 Murdock†
 Rago
 Skellyville
 St. Leo
 Varner
 Waterloo
 Willowdale

Townships
Kingman County is divided into twenty-three townships.  The city of Kingman is considered governmentally independent and is excluded from the census figures for the townships.  In the following table, the population center is the largest city (or cities) included in that township's population total, if it is of a significant size.

See also
 National Register of Historic Places listings in Kingman County, Kansas

References

Further reading

 Standard Atlas of Kingman County, Kansas; Geo. A. Ogle & Co; 74 pages; 1921.
 Plat Book of Kingman County, Kansas; Northwest Publishing Co; 45 pages; 1903.

External links

County
 
 Kingman County - Directory of Public Officials
 Kingman County - Economic Development Council
Maps
 Kingman County Maps: Current, Historic, KDOT
 Kansas Highway Maps: Current, Historic, KDOT
 Kansas Railroad Maps: Current, 1996, 1915, KDOT and Kansas Historical Society

 
Kansas counties
1872 establishments in Kansas
Populated places established in 1872